Jackson Township is a township in Daviess County, in the U.S. state of Missouri.

Jackson Township has the name of President Andrew Jackson.

References

Townships in Daviess County, Missouri